The Spanish Lake Community is a small rural village in Natchitoches Parish, Louisiana. The community got its name during the settlement of the Province of Tejas in the early 18th century. The Spanish government recognized the need to both Christianize and civilize the Indians of the province and the need to keep the French from encroaching on Spanish territory. To accomplish this they implemented a three-fold strategy. First was to establish a series of missions. Second was to provide a military presence through the establishment of the Presidio and third was the civil settlement of the territory. One such place was Los Adaes, located near what is today Robeline, Louisiana. Los Adaes served as the home to over 400 Spanish citizens, including many families, some soldiers, and a few priests, as well as converted Indians, French traders, escaped slaves, and other frontier denizens. Surnames such as Flores, Rodrigues, Moore (Mora), Sanchez, Ocon, Niette(Nieto) and Corrales and are all still known to the area today. Logjams formed in Red River of the South or Red River as early as 1100-1200 AD. Its lower end was 10 miles north of Natchitoches in 1806 and stretched nearly 300 miles up the river. The results of the logjams created many lakes in the area, Spanish Lake, Black Lake, Bistineau Lake and Cross Lake. In 1832 $20,000 was appropriated to begin work on the logjam. On April 11, 1833, Captain Henry M. Shreve of the Army Engineers began work on the logjam. By late 1836 the river was cleared, however the river continued to have logjams form and had to be continuously cleared until the 1940s when the building of the Dennison Dam brought an end to the logjams on the lower Red River. Spanish Lake drained off and became farmland. The people of Spanish Lake Community still live on the ridges of land around the lake.

Geography of Natchitoches Parish, Louisiana